Turritopsis is a genus of hydrozoans in the family Oceaniidae.

Species
According to the World Register of Marine Species, this genus includes the following species:

 Turritopsis chevalense  – species inquirenda
 Turritopsis dohrnii  also known as the "Benjamin Button jellyfish", or the "immortal jellyfish".  It can reverse its life cycle and transform itself back to a polyp.
 Turritopsis fascicularis 
 Turritopsis lata 
 Turritopsis minor 
 Turritopsis nutricula  (several separate species, including the "immortal jellyfish", were formerly classified as T. nutricula)
 Turritopsis pacifica 
 Turritopsis pleurostoma  – species inquirenda
 Turritopsis polycirrha 
 Turritopsis rubra

References

 
 

Oceaniidae
Hydrozoan genera